Rocking may refer to:

Rocking chair
Uprock, the street dance known as "Rocking"

Music

Albums
Rockin' (The Guess Who album)
Rockin' (Frankie Laine album) 1957

Songs
"Hajej, nynjej" Czech children's carol, recorded as "Rocking" by Julie Andrews on Christmas with Julie Andrews, 1982	
"The Rocking Carol", a Christmas carol by Percy Dearmer, 1928
"Rockin'", song by Pat Travers, 1982
"Rockin'" (song), song by The Weeknd on Starboy, 2016